Tandem gait is a gait (method of walking or running) where the toes of the first foot touch the heel of the next one at each step. Neurologists sometimes ask patients to walk in a straight line using tandem gait as a test to help diagnose ataxia, especially truncal ataxia, because sufferers of these disorders will have an unsteady gait. However, the results are not definitive, because many disorders or problems can cause unsteady gait (such as vision difficulties and problems with the motor neurons or associative cortex). Therefore, inability to walk correctly in tandem gait does not prove the presence of ataxia.

Profoundly affected tandem gait with no other perceptible deficits is a defining feature of posterior vermal split syndrome.

Suspects may also be asked to perform a tandem gait walk during the "walk and turn" part of a field sobriety test.

References

External links 
 http://www.neuroexam.com/content.php?p=38

Gait abnormalities